Thea Drell Hodge (November 8, 1922 – March 3, 2008) was a member of the Association for Computing Machinery and a cofounder of the Minneapolis chapter of the Association for Women in Computing. Hodge was a pioneer for women in computer science and mentored many women in the field.

Life and work
Theresa E. Drell was born in Atlantic City, New Jersey to Tully Drell and Rose White. She attended Antioch College in Ohio, where she met her husband, Philip Gibson Hodge, and graduated Magna cum laude from Hunter College in New York City in 1946.

Hodge worked at New York University from 1943 to 1944, then spent 1960–1967 at Illinois Institute of Technology. From 1967 to 1968, Hodge worked at the University of Chicago. Hodge was hired by Northwestern University in 1968, before moving to the University of Minnesota in 1971, where she worked until her retirement in 1990.

She died March 3, 2008, in Menlo Park, and was buried in Alta Mesa Memorial Park, Palo Alto, California.

Awards

 2004: Association for Computing Machinery Special Interest Group on University and College Computing Services Hall of Fame

Selected publications 

 Thea D. Hodge. (1974). The Minnesota Computer Time-Sharing Network. EDUCOM.
 Thea D. Hodge. (1978). Two-way communication between User Services and Systems programmers. In Proceedings of the 6th annual ACM SIGUCCS conference on User services (SIGUCCS '78). Association for Computing Machinery, New York, NY, USA, 9. DOI:https://doi.org/10.1145/800131.804257
 Mary C. Boyd, Lincoln Fetcher, Sara K. Graffunder, and Thea D. Hodge. (1980). Pros and cons of various user education modes. In Proceedings of the 8th annual ACM SIGUCCS conference on User services (SIGUCCS '80). Association for Computing Machinery, New York, NY, USA, 86. DOI:https://doi.org/10.1145/800086.802763
 Thea Hodge, Barbara Morgan, Barbara Wolfe, Elizabeth Little, and Douglas Van Houweling. (1983). User Services: past, present, future summary of panel discussion at USC X, Chicago. SIGUCCS Newsl. 13, 1 (Spring 1983), 5–8. DOI:https://doi.org/10.1145/1098785.1098786

References

1922 births
2008 deaths
American computer scientists
American women computer scientists
Fellows of the Association for Computing Machinery
New York University staff
Illinois Institute of Technology people
University of Chicago staff
Northwestern University staff
University of Minnesota people
20th-century American women scientists
20th-century American scientists
21st-century American women
Hunter College alumni